Aphelia peramplana is a species of moth of the family Tortricidae. It is found 
from Portugal to Greece, as well as in North Africa (Morocco, Tunisia), Malta, Crete, Iraq, from Iran east to Transcaucasia and in Siberia and Asia Minor.

The wingspan is 25–31.5 mm.

The larvae feed on Salix, Anemone, Ononis and Asphodelus species, as well as Pulsatilla pratensis and Calendula arvensis. Larvae can be found in April and May.

References

Moths described in 1816
Aphelia (moth)
Moths of Europe
Moths of Asia
Moths of Africa